Mithridates of Armenia (fl. 1st century) was a Pharnavazid prince of the Kingdom of Iberia who served as a King of Armenia under the protection of the Roman Empire.

Mithridates was installed by Roman emperor Tiberius, who invaded Armenia in AD 35. When the Parthian prince Orodes, son of Artabanus II of Parthia, attempted to dispossess Mithridates of his newly acquired kingdom, Mithridates led a large Armenian and Iberian army and defeated the Parthians in a pitched battle (Tacitus, Annals. vi. 32–35). 

Around AD 37, the new emperor Caligula had Mithridates arrested, but Claudius restored him on the Armenian throne in AD 42. Subsequently, Mithridates' relations with his brother Pharasmanes I deteriorated to the point where the Iberian king instructed his son, Rhadamistus, to invade Armenia and overthrow Mithridates in AD 51. 

Betrayed by his Roman commanders, Mithridates surrendered. Roman historian Cassius Dio reports a likely apocryphal confrontation of Mithridates and Claudius in Rome. 

Mithridates was put to death by his nephew Rhadamistus, who usurped the crown and married his cousin Zenobia, Mithridates' daughter.

References

Bibliography
 R. Grousset, History of Armenia from its origins to 1071, Paris Payot, 1947 (reprinted again in 1984, 1995 & 2008)

1st-century kings of Armenia
Roman client kings of Armenia
51 deaths
Year of birth unknown
Pharnavazid dynasty